The 2007–08 daytime network television schedule for the five major English-language commercial broadcast networks in the United States covers the weekday daytime hours from September 2007 to August 2008. The schedule is followed by a list per network of returning series, and any series canceled after the 2006–07 season.

Affiliates fill time periods not occupied by network programs with local or syndicated programming. PBS – which offers daytime programming through a children's program block, PBS Kids – is not included, as its member television stations have local flexibility over most of their schedules and broadcast times for network shows may vary. Also not included are stations affiliated with MyNetworkTV, as it has never offered a daytime network schedule or aired network news, and Ion Television, as its schedule is composed mainly of paid programming and syndicated reruns.

Legend

 New series are highlighted in bold.

Schedule
 All times correspond to U.S. Eastern and Pacific Time scheduling (except for some live sports or events). Except where affiliates slot certain programs outside their network-dictated timeslots, subtract one hour for Central, Mountain, Alaska, and Hawaii-Aleutian times.
 Local schedules may differ, as affiliates have the option to pre-empt or delay network programs. Such scheduling may be limited to preemptions caused by local or national breaking news or weather coverage (which may force stations to tape delay certain programs in overnight timeslots or defer them to a co-operated station or a digital subchannel in their regular timeslot) and any major sports events scheduled to air in a weekday timeslot (mainly during major holidays). Stations may air shows at other times at their preference.

Note:
  ABC, NBC and CBS offer their early morning newscasts via a looping feed (usually running as late as 10:00 a.m. Pacific Time) to accommodate local scheduling in the westernmost contiguous time zones or for use a filler programming for stations that do not offer a local morning newscast; some stations without a morning newscast may air syndicated or time-lease programs instead of the full newscast loop.
 CBS delayed the start of The Price Is Right 36th season by one month (until October 15, 2007) in order to allow the show to transition into its new host, Drew Carey (Bob Barker, whom Carey replaced, had retired as host of the program in June 2007 at the end of the game show's 35th season).

Saturday

Sunday

By network

ABC

Returning series:
All My Children
America This Morning
The Emperor's New School 
General Hospital
Good Morning America
Hannah Montana 
NBA Access with Ahmad Rashad
One Life to Live
Power Rangers Operation Overdrive
The Replacements 
The Suite Life of Zack and Cody 
That's So Raven 
This Week with George Stephanopoulos
The View
World News with Charles Gibson

New series:
Power Rangers Jungle Fury

Not returning from 2006–07:
Power Rangers Mystic Force

CBS

Returning series:
As the World Turns
The Bold and the Beautiful
Cake
The Early Show
CBS Evening News
CBS Morning News
CBS News Sunday Morning
Face the Nation
Guiding Light
Horseland
The Price is Right
Sabrina: The Animated Series
The Saturday Early Show
Trollz
The Young and the Restless

New series:
Care Bears: Adventures in Care-a-lot
Dino Squad
Strawberry Shortcake
Sushi Pack

Not returning from 2006–07:
Dance Revolution
Madeline

NBC

Returning series:
3-2-1 Penguins!
Babar
Days of Our Lives
Dragon
Early Today
Jacob Two-Two
Jane and the Dragon
Meet the Press
NBC Nightly News
Today
VeggieTales

New series:
My Friend Rabbit
Postman Pat
The Zula Patrol

Not returning from 2006–07:
Passions

Fox

Returning series:
Chaotic
Di-Gata Defenders
Fox News Sunday
Kirby: Right Back at Ya!
Sonic X
Teenage Mutant Ninja Turtles
This Week in Baseball
Winx Club
Viva Piñata
Yu-Gi-Oh! GX

New series:
The Adrenaline Project
Biker Mice from Mars
Dinosaur King

Not returning from 2006–07:
Bratz
G.I. Joe: Sigma 6
Yu-Gi-Oh! Capsule Monsters

The CW

Returning series:
All of Us 
The Batman
Everybody Hates Chris 
Girlfriends 
Johnny Test
Legion of Super Heroes
One Tree Hill 
Reba 
Shaggy & Scooby-Doo Get a Clue!
Teen Titans
Tom and Jerry Tales
What I Like About You 

New series:
Chaotic
Eon Kid
Gossip Girl 
Magi-Nation
Skunk Fu!
The Spectacular Spider-Man
Teenage Mutant Ninja Turtles
Will & Dewitt
World of Quest
Yu-Gi-Oh! GX

Not returning from 2006–07:
Krypto the Superdog
Monster Allergy
Loonatics Unleashed
Spider Riders
Xiaolin Showdown

See also
 2007–08 United States network television schedule (prime-time)
 2007–08 United States network television schedule (late night)

References

Sources
 
 
 

United States weekday network television schedules
2007 in American television
2008 in American television